Baselland Transport AG (BLT) is a Swiss public transport operator in the cantons of Basel-Land, Basel-Stadt, Solothurn and in France. The BLT was founded in 1974, and is owned by the Canton of Basel-Land, located to the south of the city.

The BLT jointly operates the Basel tram network with Basler Verkehrs-Betriebe (BVB), owned by the canton of Basel-Stadt. Whilst the BVB owns and operates the inner-city network, the BLT owns the infrastructure for five longer suburban routes and operates four of these itself, leaving the fifth to the BVB to operate. All the BLT routes operate over BVB infrastructure in the inner-city. Both are part of the integrated fare network Tarifverbund Nordwestschweiz (TNW), which in itself is part of the three countries-integrated fare network triregio. It also owns and operates the  Waldenburg railway.

History
BLT was formed in 1974, through the joining together of four tram and railway companies. These were:
 Birsigtalbahn (BTB)
 Birseckbahn (BEB)
 Trambahn Basel-Aesch (TBA)
 Basellandschaftliche Ueberlandbahn (BUeB)

Information
Bus Network: 115.940 km
Tram Network 65.162 km
Railway network: 
Rolling stock (2002): Approx 30 Buses, 100 trams
Passenger figures (2002): 39,782,620
Gauge: 1000mm (trams), 750mm (Waldenburg railway)
Depots: Hüslimatt, Dreispitz

Rail and tram lines

Baselland Transport owns five  railway lines over which it operates five tram services:

Buslines
37 Bottmingen - Bruderholzspital - Jakobsberg - Ulmenweg - Aeschenplatz (Bottmingen- Jakobsberg was operated by BVB from 2001)
47 Bottmingen - Bruderholzspital - Jakobsberg - St. Jakob - Muttenz
59 Bottmingen - Oberwil
60 Biel-Benken - Bottmingen - Muttenz Bahnhof - Schweizerhalle
61 Allschwil - Binningen - Oberwil - Hüslimatt
63 Dornach - Münchenstein - Muttenz
64 Bahnhof St. Johann - Bachgraben - Allschwil - Oberwil - Therwil - Reinach - Dornach - Arlesheim Dorf
65 Dornach - Aesch - Pfeffingen
66 Local Bus of Dornach
91 Waldenburg - Reigoldswil - Bretzwil
92 Hölstein - Bennwil
93 Lampenberg Dorf - Ramlinsburg - Talhaus
106 Sissach - Nusshof - Wintersingen
107 Böckten - Sissach - Eptingen
108 Sissach - Buckten - Känerkinden
109 Rümlingen - Häfelfingen

Rolling stock

Power cars
Be 4/6 101–108 (1971–1972), ex BEB
Be 4/6 109–115 (1975–1976)
Be 4/6  ex BVB Be 4/6 (1972)
Numbers: 123, 133, 135, 136, 141, 143, 158 (ex 623, 633, 635, 636, 641, 643, 658)
Be 4/6 201–266 (1978–1981), from 1999 only: 213, 224–230, 258, 260–266 (16 vehicles.)
Be 4/8 201–212, 214–223, 231–257, 259 (rebuilt from above with low floor sections 1987–1999, 50 vehicles.)

Trailers
B 1301–1303, ex VBZ B 799–801 (1973)
B 1304–1305, ex BVB B 1404, 1408 (1948)
B 1316–1322, ex BVB B 1416–1422 (1961)

Notes

References

External links

BLT homepage 
Trams of BLT and BVB

Bus companies of Switzerland
Public transport in Switzerland
Railway companies of Switzerland
Transport companies of Switzerland
Transport in Basel
Transport in Basel-Landschaft
Transport in Basel-Stadt
Transport companies established in 1974
Swiss companies established in 1974